Scythris curvipilella is a moth of the family Scythrididae. It was described by Bengt Å. Bengtsson in 2002. It is found in Kenya and Yemen.

The larvae feed on Acacia tortilis.

References

curvipilella
Moths described in 2002